Big Brother 9 is the ninth season of various versions of Big Brother  and may refer to:

 Gran Hermano Spain (season 9), the 2007 Spanish edition of Big Brother
 Big Brother 9 (UK), the 2008 edition of Big Brother UK
 Big Brother 9 (U.S.), the 2008 edition of Big Brother U.S.
 Big Brother Germany (season 9), the 2008–2009 edition of Big Brother Germany
 Grande Fratello (season 9), the 2009 Italian edition of Big Brother
 Big Brother Brasil 9, the 2009 edition of Big Brother Brasil
 Big Brother 9 (Australia), the 2012 edition of Big Brother Australia
 Big Brother 2014 (Finland), the 2014 edition of Big Brother in Finland
 Big Brother Africa 9, the 2014 edition of the African version

See also
 Big Brother (franchise)
 Big Brother (disambiguation)